Paul Lorin Bechly (born 1958) is an American chemical engineer known for his work in the development of an environmentally-oriented perfluorocarbon gas policy for DuPont and other industries. He currently works in the financial industry.

Education 

Bechly graduated in 1980 from Cornell University with a Bachelor of Science in Chemical Engineering. He began working in the financial industry in 1993, and earned his Chartered Financial Analyst designation in 2000, a Master of Science in Financial Services from The American College in 2008, and a Doctor of Business Administration from Wilmington University in 2018.

Career 

Bechly worked within the fluorochemicals business of DuPont from 1980 to 1993, where he served in roles including R&D, engineering, distribution, sales, marketing, product management, and production. Based upon his research activities at DuPont, he has been elected to full membership at Sigma Xi. Bechly joined Dean Witter in 1993. As of 2021, he was an active member of the financial industry in Greenville, Delaware,  and a Governance Fellow with the National Association of Corporate Directors. Bechly conducts private independent research through Azeas Consulting. He is currently a First Vice President at Morgan Stanley.

Perfluorocarbon gas issue 
Bechly was awarded the DuPont Chemicals Environmental Excellence Award in 1992 for "Leadership in the Development of an Environmentally Responsible Perfluorocarbons Policy for DuPont". Bechly led a team of scientists to study and provide data on sources greenhouse gases, their atmospheric effects, and options for control. These efforts led to consensus among allied industries to proactively develop responsible environmental policies regarding the chemicals. His professional works are maintained by the Hagley Museum and Library in Delaware.

In recognition of his work at DuPont on the Perfluorocarbon Gas Issue, Bechly was selected as the 2020 recipient of the Mensa Education & Research Foundation "Intellectual Benefits to Society Award".

See also 

 Perfluorinated compound
 Fluorinated gases

References

External links 

 Paul L Bechly papers (Accession 2723), Hagley Museum and Library
 Mensa Foundation page for Paul Lorin Bechly

1958 births
Living people
Cornell University alumni
American chemical engineers
DuPont people
American environmentalists
CFA charterholders
Mensans
20th-century American writers
21st-century American writers
People from Wilmington, Delaware
Wilmington University alumni